Radhi Al-Mutairi (born March 2, 1991) is a Saudi football player who plays a right-back for Al-Sharq.

Honours
Al-Fayha
 Saudi Second Division: 2013–14
 Saudi First Division: 2016–17

References

External links 
 

1991 births
Living people
Saudi Arabian footballers
Al-Fayha FC players
Al-Shabab FC (Riyadh) players
Hajer FC players
Al-Kawkab FC players
Al-Shoulla FC players
Al-Bukayriyah FC players
Al-Sharq Club players
Saudi First Division League players
Saudi Professional League players
Saudi Second Division players
Association football fullbacks